Henry Hudson (c. 1565 – 1611) was an English sea explorer and navigator.

Henry Hudson may refer to:

 Henry Hudson (artist) (born 1982), British artist
 Henry E. Hudson (born 1947), United States district court judge for the Eastern District of Virginia
 Henry Louis Hudson (1898–1975), Canadian ice hockey player
 Henry Philerin Hudson (1798–1889), Irish music collector

See also
 
 Hendrick Hudson (disambiguation)